is a Japanese female mixed martial arts (MMA) fighter and kickboxer and former boxer and professional wrestler. Takahashi is a former Smackgirl open weight champion. She is considered Japan's first female mixed martial artist.

Background

Professional wrestling career

Takahashi debuted as a professional wrestler with All Japan Women's Pro-Wrestling (AJW) promotion in 1994 and kept participating until the end of 1996, when she decided not to continue with professional wrestling due to a hernia in her back. She became a part-time referee for promotion Yoshimoto Pro-Wrestling Jd', where she met her long-time partner Megumi Yabushita. They both left Jd' in 2002.

Mixed martial arts career

At the event  on  Takahashi defeated Yuko Mukai via unanimous decision after 3 rounds.

On  at the event Central Martial Arts Association: Octagon Challenge held at the Nagoya Congress Center, Takahashi lost against pro-wrestler Rieko Amano (known by the ring name Carlos Amano) after Takahashi illegally kicked Amano in the face and was disqualified at 17 minutes and 25 seconds.

Ten days later, on  Takahashi defeated European Karate Champion Dutch Silviana Furunefield via armbar submission at LLPW event L-1 2000 The Strongest Lady.

On  at ReMix Golden Gate 2001, Takahashi was defeated by the previous tournament winner, Dutch Marloes Coenen, via submission (armbar) in the first round.

On  at Zero-One: True Century Creation '02, Takahashi drew with Yuuki Kubota after three rounds.

On  at Zero-One: Impossible to Escape Takahashi defeated Aya Koyama by submission (guillotine choke) in the first round. Along with a tag match a day before, this was Takahashi only MMA fight with the team .

This was Takahashi's first time representing her own team, formed in partnership with adult video maker Soft on Demand (SOD), SOD Women's MMA Dojo.

At Smackgirl 2004: Holy Land Triumphal Return on  Takahashi defeated masked pro-wrestler Yuiga by TKO after the referee stopped the fight when Yuiga was knocked down with punches for the second time in the last minute of the first round.

On  at Smackgirl 2004: Yuuki Kondo Retirement Celebration Takahashi defeated pro-wrestler Kaoru Ito with a kimura submission in the first round.

On  at G-Shooto Japan 04 Takahashi had a third match against Marloes Coenen, who once again defeated Takahashi, submitting her with an armbar in 39 seconds.

On  at Smackgirl 2006: Top Girl Battle Takahashi defeated Michiko Takeda via submission (rear naked choke) in the first round. As her team had recently been disbanded, in this fight Takahashi fought as a freelance with no team.

This was Takahashi's first fight with her new team, after she and Megumi Yabushita left their partnership with SOD video maker.

At Fatal Femmes Fighting 2: Girls Night Out on  Takahashi defeated former teammate Keiko Tamai with a calf slicer submission in the first round.

On  at EliteXC: Heat, Takahashi faced Brazilian Chute Boxe member Cristiane Santos, who defeated Takahashi via unanimous decision after three rounds.

At Cage Fighting Xtreme - XKL Evolution II: Mayhem in Minneapolis on  American Shana Olsen defeated Takahashi via unanimous decision after three rounds.

MMA tag matches
During her time with Smackgirl promotion, Takahashi participated in some MMA tag matches.

Kickboxing career
On  in a  held at Korakuen Hall, Takahshi lost against future shoot boxing champion Fumiko Ishimoto by majority decision after three rounds in a shoot boxing rules fight.

On , Takahashi participated in another Groove Match against an AJW member at the Stadium 2 of the Osaka Prefectural Gymnasium, where she was defeated via unanimous decision after two rounds by Kumiko Maekawa.

On  at the event , Takahashi defeated Uno by TKO (referee stoppage) in a kickboxing rules match in the first round.

On  at AJKF event Wave-VIII, Takahashi was defeated by 3-time World Champion kickboxer Naoko Kumagai via unanimous decision after 2 rounds.

Boxing career

Grappling career
At club Deep Tokyo: Megaton Grand Prix 2008 Finals on  Takahashi had a rematch against Mika Hayashi in a submission grappling match, which ended in a majority draw after two rounds.

Outside sports
In 2002 JD' faced some financial troubles that led to Takahashi and Megumi Yabushita to leave the wrestling promotion to form their own MMA team in partnership with SOD. As part of their partnership with SOD, Takahashi acted as a referee in an adult video where actresses fought naked in the ring.

After some years, Takahashi and Yabushita thought it would be better to work independently and decided to leave the partnership.

Takahashi and Yabushita later formed a new team, Tomoe-gumi, and they collaborated with Fang Gym in Tokyo in order to have training facilities.

After some time as freelancers, in 2008 Yabushita and Takahashi formed a new team, at the request of former Tomoe-gumi fighters. They became bouncers of bar / live house Exit in exchange of using the live house space for their training and amateur MMA shows during the day.

On  Takahashi, along with Megumi Yabushita, announced their association with American clothing brand Fight Chix and they decided to rename their team to Fight Chix.

Besides MMA, kickboxing and Fight Chix products commercialization, Takahashi currently works in a tuna processing plant and also as a bouncer, alternating with Megumi Yabushita.

Mixed martial arts record

|-
| Loss
| align=center| 15-12-2
| Shana Olsen
| Decision (unanimous)
| CFX - XKL Evolution II: Mayhem in Minneapolis
| 
| align=center| 3
| align=center| 5:00
| Minneapolis, Minnesota, United States
| 
|-
| Loss
| align=center| 15-11-2
| Cris Cyborg
| Decision (unanimous)
| EliteXC: Heat
| 
| align=center| 3
| align=center| 3:00
| Sunrise, Florida, United States
| 
|-
| Loss
| align=center| 15-10-2
| Hiroko Yamanaka
| Decision (unanimous)
| Smackgirl 2007: Queens' Hottest Summer
| 
| align=center| 3
| align=center| 5:00
| Tokyo, Japan
| 
|-
| Win
| align=center| 15-9-2
| Keiko Tamai
| Submission (calf slicer)
| Fatal Femmes Fighting 2: Girls Night Out
| 
| align=center| 1
| align=center| 2:27
| Compton, California, United States
| 
|-
| Win
| align=center| 14-9-2
| Alicia Mena
| Submission (rear naked choke)
| Smackgirl 2007: The Queen Said The USA Is Strongest
| 
| align=center| 1
| align=center| 3:04
| Tokyo, Japan
| 
|-
| Loss
| align=center| 13-9-2
| Jen Case
| Submission (armbar)
| Fatal Femmes Fighting: Asian Invasion
| 
| align=center| 2
| align=center| 1:39
| Los Angeles, California, United States
| 
|-
| Win
| align=center| 13-8-2
| Michiko Takeda
| Submission (guillotine choke)
| Smackgirl 2006: Top Girl Battle
| 
| align=center| 1
| align=center| 4:09
| Tokyo, Japan
| 
|-
| Win
| align=center| 12-8-2
| Yong Joo Lee
| Submission (heel hook)
| Deep: CMA Festival
| 
| align=center| 2
| align=center| 0:47
| Tokyo, Japan
| 
|-
| Loss
| align=center| 11-8-2
| Marloes Coenen
| Submission (armbar)
| G-Shooto: G-Shooto 04
| 
| align=center| 1
| align=center| 0:39
| Tokyo, Japan
| 
|-
| Win
| align=center| 11-7-2
| Mika Hayashi
| TKO (head kick)
| G-Shooto: Plus05
| 
| align=center| 1
| align=center| 0:47
| Tokyo, Japan
| 
|-
| Win
| align=center| 10-7-2
| Emma Bush
| Submission (scarf hold armlock)
| Smackgirl: Korea 2005
| 
| align=center| 1
| align=center| 4:13
| Suwon, South Korea
| 
|-
| Loss
| align=center| 9-7-2
| Marloes Coenen
| TKO (punches)
| Smackgirl 2004: World ReMix
| 
| align=center| 1
| align=center| 2:30
| Shizuoka, Shizuoka, Japan
| 
|-
| Win
| align=center| 9-6-2
| Kaoru Ito
| Submission (kimura)
| Smackgirl 2004: Yuuki Kondo Retirement Celebration
| 
| align=center| 1
| align=center| 1:34
| Tokyo, Japan
| 
|-
| Win
| align=center| 8-6-2
| Yuiga
| TKO (punches)
| Smackgirl 2004: Holy Land Triumphal Return
| 
| align=center| 1
| align=center| 4:33
| Tokyo, Japan
| 
|-
| Loss
| align=center| 7-6-2
| Irma Verhoeff
| Decision
| It's Showtime 2004 Amsterdam
| 
| align=center| 3
| align=center| 3:00
| Amsterdam, Netherlands
| 
|-
| Win
| align=center| 7-5-2
| Aya Koyama
| Submission (guillotine choke)
| Zero-One: Impossible to Escape
| 
| align=center| 1
| align=center| 1:43
| Tokyo, Japan
| 
|-
| Loss
| align=center| 6-5-2
| Irma Verhoeff
| TKO (punches)
| Free Fight Explosion 2
| 
| align=center| 1
| 
| Beverwijk, Netherlands
| 
|-
| Draw
| align=center| 6-4-2
| Yuuki Kondo
| Draw
| Zero-One: True Century Creation '02
| 
| align=center| 3
| align=center| 3:00
| Tokyo, Japan
| 
|-
| Win
| align=center| 6-4-1
| Mika Harigai
| Submission (Achilles lock)
| Smackgirl: Pioneering Spirit
| 
| align=center| 1
| align=center| 2:35
| Tokyo, Japan
| 
|-
| Draw
| align=center| 5-4-1
| Miwako Ishihara
| Draw
| Club Fight vol. 4
| 
| align=center| 1
| align=center| 10:00
| Tokyo, Japan
| 
|-
| Loss
| align=center| 5-4-0
| Marloes Coenen
| Submission (armbar)
| ReMix Golden Gate 2001
| 
| align=center| 1
| align=center| 1:13
| Tokyo, Japan
| 
|-
| Win
| align=center| 5-3-0
| Sandra de Langeais
| TKO (punches)
| Smackgirl: Episode 0
| 
| align=center| 1
| align=center| 1:27
| Tokyo, Japan
| 
|-
| Win
| align=center| 4-3-0
| Silviana Furunefield
| Submission (armbar)
| LLPW: L-1 2000 The Strongest Lady
| 
| align=center| 1
| align=center| 1:28
| Tokyo, Japan
| 
|-
| Win
| align=center| 3-3-0
| Mari Kaneko
| Submission (Achilles lock)
| Club Fight Round 1
| 
| align=center| 1
| align=center| 4:01
| Tokyo, Japan
| 
|-
| Win
| align=center| 2-3-0
| Aya Mitsui
| TKO (punches)
| LLPW: Ultimate Challenge '98 L-1
| 
| align=center| 1
| align=center| 1:54
| Tokyo, Japan
|
|-
| Loss
| align=center| 1-3-0
| Rieko Amano
| DQ (illegal soccer kick)
| CMA: Octagon Challenge
| 
| align=center| 1
| align=center| 17:25
| Nagoya, Japan
| 
|-
| Loss
| align=center| 1-2-0
| Becky Levi
| Submission (punches)
| The U-Japan Super Fighting '96 vol. 1
| 
| align=center| 1
| align=center| 2:13
| Tokyo, Japan
| 
|-
| Loss
| align=center| 1-1-0
| Irina Rodina
| Submission (armbar)
| U Top Tournament: First Round
| 
| align=center| 1
| align=center| 6:06
| Tokyo, Japan
| 
|-
| Win
| align=center| 1-0-0
| Kirstie Bragard
| Submission (head kick)
| U Top Tournament: Participants Selection Matches
| 
| align=center| 1
| align=center| 10:14
| Tokyo, Japan
|

Kickboxing record

|-
|
|Loss
| Rie Murakami
|Charity kickboxing event: No Name Heroes 10
|Yuzawa, Akita Prefecture, Japan
|TKO (punches)
|3
|1:50
|2-4-1
| 
|-
|
|Loss
| Naoko Kumagai
|AJKF: Wave-VIII
|Bunkyo, Tokyo, Japan
|Decision (0-3)
|2
|5:00
|2-3-1
| 
|-
|
|Win
| Uno
|Jd' Kyoto Tournament
|Kyoto, Kyoto Prefecture, Japan
|TKO (referee stoppage)
|1
|2:34
|2-2-1
| 
|-
|
|style="background: #c5d2ea"|Draw
| Tomomi Sunaba
|Jd' 3rd Anniversary
|Bunkyo, Tokyo, Japan
|Draw (1-0)
|3
|3:00
|1-2-1
| 
|-
|
|Loss
| Kumiko Maekawa
| 
|Osaka, Osaka Prefecture, Japan
|Decision (0-3)
|2
|5:00
|1-2-0
| 
|-
|
|Win
| Saya Endo
| 
|Sumida, Tokyo, Japan
|Decision (3-0)
|3
|3:00
|1-1-0
| 
|-
|
|Loss
| Fumiko Ishimoto
| 
|Bunkyo, Tokyo, Japan
|Decision (0-2)
|3
|3:00
|0-1-0
|
|-
| colspan=10 | Legend:

Professional boxing record

Grappling record

|-
|
|style="background: #c5d2ea"|Draw
| Mika Hayashi
|club Deep Tokyo: Megaton Grand Prix 2008 Finals
|Kabukicho, Tokyo, Japan
|Decision (0-1)
|2
|5:00
|16-11-3
|-
| colspan=9 | Legend:

Championships and accomplishments
Smackgirl open weight champion

See also
List of female mixed martial artists
List of female kickboxers
List of female boxers

References

External links

Profile at Fightergirls.com

Profile at Good Luck Company 
Official blog 
Official blog (old) 

Japanese female mixed martial artists
Mixed martial artists utilizing boxing
Mixed martial artists utilizing kickboxing
Mixed martial artists utilizing wrestling
Japanese female kickboxers
Japanese female professional wrestlers
Japanese women boxers
1973 births
Living people
People from Otaru
Sportspeople from Hokkaido